South Western Football Club (sometimes referred to as Glasgow South Western) was a Scottish football club active in the 19th century.

History

The club was founded in 1875, the first known match being against Govan F.C. at Fairfield Park that December.  The club became a member of the Scottish Football Association at the start of the 1876-77 season, in time to enter the Scottish Cup, which it did from that season to 1883–84. 

The club's furthest run was to the quarter-finals, which it achieved twice.  In 1877–78 the S.W. won (to general surprise) the initial quarter-final match against the 3rd Lanarkshire Rifle Volunteers, before losing 2–1 when the tie was replayed following a protest by their opponents; the protest being that the ropes around the ground were not secure enough to keep the spectators back, and there was therefore interference with play, although the Volunteers did not protest before the match.  South Western protested about the Scottish FA's decision, to no avail.

The club reached the same stage again in 1879–80, losing 6–1 to Pollokshields Athletic.  In 1880-81 the club lost 4-3 at Arthurlie in the third round, but protested on the basis that the final half-an-hour was played in the dark, and "the home team again and again claimed to have scored, and every run, no matter where it finished, was hailed with shouts of a goal by the spectators".  The protest was successful, and the tie re-played, with South-Western scoring a last-minute equalizer with a shot from Allan going in off the bar.  However no further replays took place as South-Western was disqualified for an unknown reason.

Despite joining the newly formed Glasgow Football Association in April 1883, South Western made its final appearance in the Scottish Cup in September of that year, losing 8–1 against Battlefield in the first round. Shortly afterwards, having already absorbed Luton, it was reported that they were considering amalgamating with another local club, Pilgrims, for whom some of the South Western players had been guesting. Within the next couple of months, South Western had been absorbed by Pilgrims, who took over the use of Copeland Park.

A club of the same name re-emerged in the area in 1885 (a merger of two local teams, Beaconsfield and Woodbourne) and joined the newly founded Scottish Junior Football Association a year later; they survived until 1894.

Colours

The club's initial colours were black and orange one-inch stripes and white knickerbockers.  In 1878 the club changed to cardinal and white, and in 1880 to navy shirts and white shorts.

Ground

The club's home ground was Copeland Park in Govan, situated close to Ibrox railway station.  The club planned to hire a new ground off the Paisley Road for the start of the 1876-77 season but it did not move.

Notable players

John Campbell of South Western played for Scotland in an international match against Wales in March 1880.

John Belger, "the Goalkeeper Smasher", who became captain of Preston North End in the 1880s, and whose career was ended by a broken leg in 1884.

Notes

References

Defunct football clubs in Scotland
Football clubs in Glasgow
Govan
Association football clubs disestablished in 1883
1883 disestablishments in Scotland
Association football clubs established in 1875
1875 establishments in Scotland